II is the second studio album by Dutch band The Common Linnets. The album was released on 25 September 2015 through Universal Music Group. The lead single, "We Don't Make the Wind Blow" was released on 1 May 2015

Singles
"We Don't Make the Wind Blow" was released as the lead single from the album on 1 May 2015. The song peaked to number 74 on the Dutch Singles Chart. The song has also charted in Belgium.

Reception

Commercial performance
On 3 October 2015 the album entered the Dutch Albums Chart at number 1. On 9 October 2015 the album entered the Austrian Albums Chart at number 32. The album entered the German Albums Chart at number 18.

Track listing

Chart performance

Weekly charts

Year-end charts

Release history

References

2015 albums
The Common Linnets albums
Universal Music Netherlands albums